Alyosha Andonov (Bulgarian: Альошa Андонов) (born 31 January 1961 in Sofia) is a Bulgarian football head coach who is a former coach of PFC Belasitsa Petrich.

Andonov graduated from the Higher Training School of NSA. He has been a professional player for PFC CSKA Sofia, PFC Belasitsa Petrich in the BG First division, PFC Dunav Rousse, PFC Beroe, "Minior" (Pernik) , and FC Lübeck (Germany). He used to coach FC Novi Iskar, and was head coach of FC Minior (Bobov dol).

References

Living people
1961 births
Bulgarian football managers
PFC Svetkavitsa managers
PFC Slavia Sofia managers